Almost Friends (also titled The Chef's Wife)  is a 2014 French comedy-drama film written, directed by, and starring Anne Le Ny, along with Karin Viard, Emmanuelle Devos and Roschdy Zem. It was shot in and around Orléans.

Plot 
Marithé works in a training centre and her task is to assist people who are seeking alternative job options. One day, Carole arrives at the centre. She has never completed her studies and is starting to feel overshadowed by her husband, Sam, a talented Michelin-starred chef. It seems that it is not a job that Carole needs, but rather about her asserting her own independence and to leave her husband; and Marithé does all to help Carole to set out down a new path. However, things become complicated when the man Marithé is secretly attracted to is Sam.

Cast 
 Karin Viard as Marithé Bressy 
 Emmanuelle Devos as Carole Drissi
 Roschdy Zem as Sam Drissi
 Anne Le Ny as Nathalie Perusel 
 Philippe Rebbot as Pierre Perusel 
 Philippe Fretun as Michel
 Annie Mercier as Jackie
 Marion Lécrivain as Dorothée
 Yan Tassin as Théo
 Marion Malenfant as Cynthia
 Xavier de Guillebon as Vincent
 Xavier Béja as Pascal
 Jonathan Cohen as The supervisor

References

External links 
 

2014 films
2014 comedy-drama films
2010s French-language films
French comedy-drama films
Films directed by Anne Le Ny
Films about marriage
Films about infidelity
2010s French films